The Wigan Baronetcy, of Clare Lawn in Mortlake in the County of Surrey and Purland Chase in Ross in the County of Hereford, is a title in the Baronetage of the United Kingdom. It was created on 9 March 1898 for Frederick Wigan, a Director of the North London Railway. The presumed 6th Baronet, listed in Debrett's Peerage (2015) as the son of the 5th Baronet, has not successfully proven his succession and is consequently not on the Official Roll of the Baronetage.

Wigan baronets, of Clare Lawn and Purland Chase (1898)
Sir Frederick Wigan, 1st Baronet (1827–1907)
Sir Frederick William Wigan, 2nd Baronet (1859–1907)
Sir Roderick Grey Wigan, 3rd Baronet (1886–1954)
Sir Frederick Adair Wigan, 4th Baronet (1911–1979)
Sir Alan Lewis Wigan, 5th Baronet (1913–1996)
Sir Michael Iain Wigan, 6th Baronet (presumed) (1951–present)

References
Kidd, Charles, Williamson, David (editors). Debrett's Peerage and Baronetage (1990 edition). New York: St Martin's Press, 1990.

Baronetcies in the Baronetage of the United Kingdom
Mortlake, London
1898 establishments in England
Noble titles created in 1898